Eva Bacharach (c. 1580–1651) was a Hebraist and rabbinical scholar. 

She was born in Prague, the daughter of Isaac ben Simson ha-Kohen, and through her mother, Vögele, granddaughter of the well-known rabbi of Prague, Judah Loew ben Bezalel. Her brothers, Ḥayyim and Naphtali, were also noted rabbis. As a daughter of such a distinguished rabbinical family, she acquired a wide knowledge of Hebrew and rabbinical literature, and could often assist rabbis in solving textual difficulties. Such erudition was quite uncommon among Jewish women of that time, and the Memorbuch of Worms makes special mention of it.

In 1600 she married Abraham Samuel Bacharach, with whom she subsequently went to Worms, to where he was called as rabbi. After his death on May 26, 1615, she returned with her son Samson and her three daughters to Prague, in order to devote herself to the education of her children. Eva refused an offer of marriage from Isaiah Horowitz, then rabbi of Prague, who was about to emigrate to Jerusalem, although she longed to be in the Holy Land. When her three daughters were married, she followed her son Samson to Worms, whither he had been called to take the position of his father; and soon afterward, in 1651, she left for Palestine. On the journey, Eva Bacharach died in Sofia, where she was buried with great honor. Her grandson, Yair Bacharach, called his work in memory of her Havvot Yair, which, in the usual German pronunciation, might be understood as "Eva's Yair."

References

 Its bibliography:
Kaufmann, Bacharach und Seine Ahnen, 1894, pp. 3, 23, 24, 27, 28
Eisenstadt-Weiner, Da'at Ḳedoshim, pp. 215-217

1580s births
1651 deaths
Czech Jews
16th-century Jews
16th-century Bohemian people
17th-century Jews
17th-century Bohemian people
16th-century Bohemian women
17th-century Bohemian women
People from Prague